Mériadeck tram stop is located on line A of the Tramway de Bordeaux, and served as terminus of that line between 21 December 2003, when the line opened, and 26 September 2005, when the line was extended to Saint-Augustin. The stop is located in the commune of Bordeaux and is operated by the TBC.

For most of the day on Mondays to Fridays, trams run at least every five minutes in both directions through the stop. Services run less frequently in the early morning, late evenings, weekends and public holidays.

References

Bordeaux tramway stops
Tram stops in Bordeaux
Railway stations in France opened in 2003